Serhiy Senyukov (27 January 1955 – 1 September 1992) was a high jumper who represented the Soviet Union. He trained at Spartak.

Achievements

References

External links
Sports Reference
European Indoor Championships

1955 births
1992 deaths
Soviet male high jumpers
Ukrainian male high jumpers
Athletes (track and field) at the 1976 Summer Olympics
Olympic athletes of the Soviet Union
Spartak athletes